Hermissenda crassicornis, also known as the opalescent nudibranch or thick-horned nudibranch, is a species of brightly coloured, sea slug or nudibranch, a marine gastropod mollusc in the family Facelinidae.

Distribution
This nudibranch lives from Kodiak Island, Alaska, to Northern California. It is replaced by Hermissenda opalescens to the south of Northern California.

Habitat
This species is found in various habitats, including the intertidal zone of rocky shores, but also in bays and estuaries.

Description
The species grows to be about 50 mm, or about 2 inches. The colour of this nudibranch varies from one locality to another, but it is always easily recognizable by the orange stripe along its head area and the white stripes on the cerata.

Life habits
This nudibranch feeds on hydroids and other marine organisms such as ascidians and sea anemones. It sometimes attacks other nudibranchs, and will eat smaller specimens of its own species.  It's also been known to eat sea pens, small crustaceans, and stranded jellies.

References

Facelinidae
Western North American coastal fauna
Molluscs of North America
Gastropods described in 1831
Taxa named by Johann Friedrich von Eschscholtz